Decodon verticillatus, the sole species in the genus Decodon, is a flowering plant in the family Lythraceae. It is commonly known as waterwillow or swamp loosestrife. It is native to wetlands in the eastern half of the United States and Canada.

Description

Waterwillow is a clump-forming shrubby perennial that grows in swamps or shallow water. They sometimes root at the tip when they bough over and touch the mud. The leaves are lanceolate, either in opposite pairs or in whorls of three or four. The rose-pink flowers grow in axillary clusters. The ten stamens are projecting with five longer than the rest. There is one pistil, one style and a superior ovary. The fruit is a spherical dark brown capsule with numerous reddish seeds. Flowering takes place in June and July.

Habitat
Waterwillow is found in swampland, in ditches, besides streams and in shallow water at the edges of ponds and lakes. It often forms thickets and occurs in the United States from Maine to Florida and west to Minnesota, Tennessee and Louisiana, as well as in eastern Canada.

Fossil record
Seeds of Decodon from the late Campanian (73.5 MA) of northern Mexico is the earliest fossil record of the genus. Seeds of the genus are known in Europe from Pliocene to lower Pleistocene. These seeds are assigned to an extinct species, D. globosus. A seed very similar to the modern American species has been found in sediments from Ipswichian in Ireland, and it is possible that the plant survived until the last interglacial in western Europe.

Associated species
 The larva of the hydrangea sphinx, Darapsa versicolor, feeds on waterwillow.
 The larva of the waterwillow stem borer moth, Papaipema sulphurata, feeds on waterwillow.

References

Lythraceae
Flora of North America
Plants described in 1753
Taxa named by Carl Linnaeus